Matthias Ssekamaanya (born 15 October 1936), is a Ugandan priest, who is the Bishop Emeritus of the Roman Catholic Diocese of Lugazi, having been appointed to that position on 9 March 1985 and having retired as bishop on 4 November 2014.

Early life and priesthood
Ssekamaanya was born on 15 October 1936, in Kasolo Village, in present-day Mubende District in the Buganda Region of Uganda. He was ordained priest on 19 December 1965 at the  Archdiocese of Kampala and severed as priest in Kampala Archdiocese, until 9 March 1985.

As bishop
He was appointed bishop on 9 March 1985, serving as Auxiliary Bishop of Kampala and as Titular Bishop of Iziriana. He was ordained bishop on 2 June 1985 at Kampala by Cardinal Emmanuel Kiwanuka Nsubuga†, Archbishop of Kampala, assisted by Bishop Barnabas Rugwizangonga Halem ’Imana†, Bishop of Kabale and Bishop Paul Lokiru Kalanda†, Bishop of  Moroto.

He was appointed Bishop of the Diocese of Lugazi on 30 November 1996 by Pope John Paul II and installed as the first (founding) Bishop of Lugazi. On 4 November 2014, his age-related resignation was accepted by Pope Francis, who appointed Bishop Christopher Kakooza as his replacement.

See also
 Uganda Martyrs
 Roman Catholicism in Uganda

Succession table

References

External links

Young Couples Told To Seek Advice As of 20 October 2018.
‘Eat’ the money, but vote development, says bishop As at 18 February 2015.
Can Prayers Really Help Students Pass Exams? As at 24 October 2010.

1936 births
Living people
Ganda people
People from Mubende District
20th-century Roman Catholic bishops in Uganda
21st-century Roman Catholic bishops in Uganda
People from Central Region, Uganda
Roman Catholic archbishops of Kampala
Roman Catholic bishops of Lugazi